The Central Black Forest, also called the Middle Black Forest, is a natural or cultural division of the Black Forest in Baden-Württemberg in Germany. It generally refers to a region of deeply incised valleys from the Rench valley and southern foothills of the Kniebis in the north to the area of Freiburg im Breisgau and Donaueschingen in the south. Its highest area, which is southeast of the Elz valley, is also part of the High Black Forest.

Geography 
The dominating valley system of the Kinzig cuts through the Middle Black Forest from east to west. Prominent peaks are the Kandel, Weißtannenhöhe, Obereck, Rohrhardsberg, Brend, Stöcklewald and Mooswaldkopf south of the Kinzig, and the Brandenkopf and Lettstädter Höhe north of the Kinzig.

Geology 
Gneisses and granites predominate. Unlike the Northern Black Forest the Bunter sandstone covering with its plateau-like mountain shapes has only survived in a few places on the eastern perimeter. Elsewhere the land is marked by narrow ridges and valley floors or, especially in the southeast or even in island-like remnants, hilly highland valley landscapes.

The average height of the Central Black Forest is rather lower than in the Northern and Southern Black Forest. Relative heights are, however, similar; steep mountainsides can rise to 700 metres above the valley bottoms (e.g. in the valley of Simonswälder Tal).

Significant sub-landscapes and natural monuments 
 Glottertal (well known from the TV series, Die Schwarzwaldklinik)
 Elz valley
 Simonswälder Tal, valley of the Wilde Gutach
 Berneck valley, gorge on the upper Schiltach
 Kostgfäll Gorge
 Triberg Waterfalls
 Zweribach Waterfalls
 Burgbach Waterfall
 Glaswaldsee, lake below the Lettstädter Höhe

Significant settlements and cultural monuments 
 Black Forest Open Air Museum, Vogtsbauernhof
 German Clock Museum in Furtwangen
 Timber-framed towns of Schiltach and Haslach im Kinzigtal
 Wolfach, glassworks and old town quarter
 Gengenbach, once a free imperial city (old town with abbey and town fortifications)
 Alpirsbach, Romanesque abbey (built from around 1050), one of the few surviving in the Hirsauer Style
 Zell am Harmersbach, formerly the smallest free imperial city in the Holy Roman Empire, timber-framed buildings and Jugendstil
 Schramberg, important industrial town of the Central Black Forest
 St. Peter's Abbey with Baroque library and abbey church
 Villingen-Schwenningen, largest town on the eastern perimeter of the Central Black Forest
 Triberg with its waterfall and the Black Forest Local History Museum
 St. Georgen with its Phono Museum

Footpaths 
 Hansjakobweg I (3 day circular walk)
 Hansjakobweg II (4 day circular walk)
 Rottweil–Lahr Black Forest Trail (4 days)
 Gengenbach–Alpirsbach Black Forest Trail (2–3 days)
 Mittelweg
 Ostweg (long distance path)
 Westweg (long distance path)
 Kandelhöhenweg (5 days)
 Zweitälersteig (5 days, long distance path)

References

External links 

 Website of the Central Black Forest

!
Regions of Baden-Württemberg
Black Forest
Baden